Luca Lacrimini (born 10 March 1978 in Città di Castello) is a former Italian footballer.

Biography
On 21 July 2006 he was loaned to Frosinone. On 30 July 2007 he left for Serie C1 side Ancona.

On 1 September 2008 he joined Cavese on free transfer. In July 2009 he left for Perugia.

References

External links
Player Profile at Gazzetta dello Sport website

1978 births
Living people
Italian footballers
Fermana F.C. players
S.S. Chieti Calcio players
S.S.C. Napoli players
Frosinone Calcio players
A.C. Ancona players
A.C. Perugia Calcio players
Association football defenders